Con Funk Shun (formerly known as Project Soul) is an American R&B and funk band whose popularity began in the mid-1970s and ran through the 1980s. They were influenced by funk legend James Brown and Sly and the Family Stone. Signed to Mercury Records in 1976, Con Funk Shun enjoyed a decade of successful national and overseas tours, eleven chart-topping albums, and numerous hit singles. The group formally disbanded in 1986.

History
The band began in 1969 as "Project Soul", formed by Louis A. McCall Sr. (drums/percussion/vocals) and Michael Cooper (rhythm guitar/lead vocals), both of whom were high school students in Vallejo, California. By 1971, the band also included bassist Cedric Martin, keyboardist Danny "Sweet Man" Thomas, trumpeter Karl Fuller, and woodwinds player Paul "Maceo" Harrell. Soon thereafter, this fledgling group's classic lineup became complete when lead vocals/multi-instrumentalist Felton Pilate came on board. 

In 1971, the seven musicians formed a new band, calling themselves "Con-Funk-Shun", after a song by the instrumental ensemble the Nite-Liters. They relocated to Memphis, Tennessee in 1973 when they were hired to back up Stax Records artists the Soul Children. There, they came to the attention of Estelle Axton who signed them to her "Fretone Records" label. Their début album, Organized Con Funk Shun, was released in 1973. In 1975 the band’s name was altered from "Confunkshun" to "Con Funk Shun" by Louis’ wife Linda Lou McCall who also handled the marketing and public relations. They went to Japan for performance in 1975.

In 1976, Con Funk Shun signed to Mercury Records, and then went on to release eleven albums over a span of ten years. The band's 1977 album, Secrets, was certified gold in the United States, as were the 1978 album Loveshine, the 1979 album Candy, and the 1980 album Spirit of Love. They scored a string of top ten hit songs on the U.S. Billboard black singles chart, including "Ffun" (No. 1 in 1978), "Shake and Dance with Me" (No. 5 in 1978), "Chase Me" (No. 4 in 1979), "Got to Be Enough" (No. 8 in 1980), "Too Tight" (No. 8 in 1981), "Baby, I'm Hooked (Right into Your Love)" (No. 5 in 1983), and "Electric Lady" (No. 4 in 1985). "Ffun" (#23) and "Too Tight" (#40) were the group's only songs that crossed over onto the top 40 on the Billboard Hot 100; 2 others did make the chart, while 4 of their songs hit the Billboard Bubbling Under Hot 100 chart.  

Tensions from within the group built over the 1980s, and the band's final album, Burning Love, was recorded without multi instrument-vocalist and songwriter Felton Pilate. After disappointing album sales, Mercury invoked its "key member clause" and dropped the band from the label. Michael Cooper then moved on to a solo run with Warner Bros. Cooper had an R&B hit with "To Prove My Love" in 1987. The remaining original members tried to continue, but repeated efforts with new lead singers fell short, and they ceased performing and recording as Con Funk Shun in 1987.

Later years
Pilate became the in-house record producer and songwriter for M.C. Hammer and his record label Bust It Records. He worked on several albums for the company, including Hammer's Please Hammer, Don't Hurt 'Em album, as well as the bulk of Special Generation's 1990 début album, Take It to the Floor. Lead singer Michael Cooper embarked on a successful career as a solo artist, releasing his solo début album Love Is Such a Funny Game on Warner Bros. Records in 1987, and releasing the 1989 album Just What I Like and the 1992 album Get Closer on Warner Bros.' sister label Reprise Records.

As recently as 2013, their eleven Mercury Records albums, along with their Greatest Hits and Best of Con Funk Shun albums, continue to be remastered and released digitally.

In 2015, the More than Love album was released. Three of the original band members, Michael Cooper, Felton Pilate and Karl Fuller, currently tour as Con Funk Shun. In March 2017, they celebrated their 45th anniversary as a band with four sold-out shows at Yoshi's in Oakland, California.

Legacy
As the late Louis A. McCall Sr. was born in Alameda, California, his name was chosen in April 2014 by the Alameda City Planning Board to be used for one of the street names in the proposed residential community, Alameda Landing.

On September 21, 2014, the seven band members were honored by the National R&B Music Society with a Lifetime Achievement Award, at a black tie dinner and award ceremony in Atlantic City, New Jersey.

In 1996, the R&B group Dru Hill covered Con Funk Shun's "Love's Train" for their eponymous debut album. The song was also covered in February 2022 by R&B duo Silk Sonic.

Band members
Michael Cooper
Karl Fuller
Paul "Zebulon" Harrell
Cedric Martin 
Louis A. McCall, Sr. (deceased)
Felton Pilate
Danny "Sweet Man" Thomas
Eric "EQ" Young
Ron Moton
Melvin Carter

Discography

Albums

Singles

References

External links

 Official Con Funk Shun Website
 
 
 Con Funk Shun @ Discogs
 ExxtraFoxxMusic.com 
 Felton Pilate's Official Site
 Con Funk Shun @ soulandfunkmusic.com

American dance music groups
American funk musical groups
Musical groups from the San Francisco Bay Area
American soul musical groups
Musical groups established in 1969
Musical groups disestablished in 1986